National Route 445 is a national highway of Japan connecting Chūō-ku, Kumamoto and Hitoyoshi, Kumamoto in Japan, with a total length of 136.1 km (84.6 mi).

References

National highways in Japan
Roads in Kumamoto Prefecture